Ateekur Rahman is a Bangladeshi sports shooter. He is the first Bangladeshi alongside Abdus Sattar to win a medal for Bangladesh in the Commonwealth Games. He won two medals in 1990 Commonwealth Games. He won gold in the Air Pistol - Pairs event and bronze in the Free Pistol - Pairs event, both partnering with Abdus Sattar.

References

Living people
Bangladeshi male sport shooters
Commonwealth Games gold medallists for Bangladesh
Commonwealth Games silver medallists for Bangladesh
Shooters at the 1990 Commonwealth Games
Commonwealth Games medallists in shooting
Commonwealth Games bronze medallists for Bangladesh
Year of birth missing (living people)
Medallists at the 1990 Commonwealth Games